Raicho Vasilev is a Bulgarian stunt/actor best known for his role Gladiator Gnaeus on the TV series Spartacus: Blood and Sand and its prequel Spartacus: Gods of the Arena.

Biography 
Raicho started his professional career in 1999  when he was a stunt performer in the movie Delta Force.

Raicho Vasilev was also Liam McIntyre's stunt double, in the TV Show Spartacus.

Filmography and Works

Actor

Stunt Performer/ Stunt Coordinator

Commercials

Music Video Clips

References

External links 
 

Bulgarian male television actors
Living people
1975 births